The 1933 International University Games were organised by the Confederation Internationale des Etudiants (CIE) and held in Turin, Italy. Held from 1–10 September, 27 nations competed in nine sports. Women competed only in the athletics, swimming, fencing, and tennis events (the latter two being debut events for women). This edition marked the first appearance of African athletes at the competition, as South Africa and Egypt sent delegations for the first time.

Sports

Medal summary

Men

Women

Athletics medal table

Participating nations

References
World Student Games (Pre-Universiade) - GBR Athletics 

Summer World University Games
Athletics at the Summer Universiade
International University Games
International University Games
International University Games
Sports competitions in Turin
International athletics competitions hosted by Italy
September 1933 sports events
1930s in Turin